The doubles luge at the 2012 Winter Youth  Olympics took place on 16 January at the Olympic Sliding Centre Innsbruck.

Results
Two runs were used to determine the winner.

References

Doubles